Isomaltase  is an enzyme that breaks the bonds linking saccharides, which cannot be broken by amylase or maltase.  It digests polysaccharides at the alpha 1-6 linkages.  Its substrate, alpha-limit dextrin, is a product of amylopectin digestion that retains its 1-6 linkage (its alpha 1-4 linkages having already been broken down by amylase).  The product of the enzymatic digestion of alpha-limit dextrin by isomaltase is maltose.   

Isomaltase helps amylase to digest alpha-limit dextrin to produce maltose. The human sucrase-isomaltase is a dual-function enzyme with two GH31 domains, one serving as the isomaltase, the other as a sucrose alpha-glucosidase.

Nomenclature 

The systematic name of sucrase-isomaltase is oligosaccharide 6-alpha-glucohydrolase.  This enzyme is also known as:
 Sucrase-alpha-dextrinase
 oligo-1,6-glucosidase,
 limit dextrin,
 so maltase,
 exo-oligo-1,6-glucosidase,
 dextrin 6alpha-glucanohydrolase,
 alpha-limit dextrin,
 dextrin 6-glucanohydrolase, and
 oligosaccharide alpha-1,6-glucohydrolase.

Mechanism 

This enzyme catalyses the following chemical reaction

 Hydrolysis of (1->6)-alpha-D-glucosidic linkages in some oligosaccharides produced from starch and glycogen by enzyme EC 3.2.1.1.
Hydrolysis uses water to cleave chemical bonds. Sucrase-isomaltase’s mechanism results in a net retention of configuration at the anomeric center.

External links

References

Hydrolases